Maharajadhiraja Sawai Madho Singh II  (28 August 1862 – 7 September 1922), was the Maharajadhiraja of Jaipur  from 1880 until 1922. He was the adopted son of Ram Singh II, Raja of Jaipur.

Biography

He was born Kaim Singh, the second son of the Thakur of Isardha, a petty chieftain related to the ruling house of Jaipur. After the death of their father, a dispute with his elder brother over the succession left the teenaged Kaim exiled and living in poverty. He found work as a risaldar in the cavalry of the Nawab of Tonk.

His fate was altered by his encounters with the guru Brahmachari Giridhari Sharan, whose disciple he became, and with the ruling Ram Singh II. When Ram died in 1880, he had no heir, and chose on his deathbed to adopt the 18-year-old Kaim, who was crowned under the name Madho. Married   a Jadaun lady, daughter of Rao Budhpal Singh of Ummargarh estate, Etah, U.P.

As ruler of the large and prosperous state of Jaipur, Madho Singh embraced modern ideas on education and sanitation. He built schools, colleges, hospitals and a museum. When famine struck in 1896–1897 and 1899–1900, he used state funds to feed the population. He also appealed to the Viceroy, Lord Curzon, to start a permanent Famine Relief Fund, which Singh began with a gift of £133,000.

Singh was exceptionally loyal to the British crown, and sent his troops and horses to assist the British side in fighting in Chitral in 1894–1895, the Tirah Campaign in 1897–1898 and in the South African War.  In the First World War, he again sent his men and machine guns to assist in the Mesopotamian campaign at his own expense.

Singh was made an honorary Major-General, and was further rewarded with honours. He was made Knight Grand Commander of the Order of the Star of India and of the Order of the Indian Empire, and a Knight Grand Cross of the Royal Victorian Order and of the Order of the British Empire.

In 1921, he adopted the second son of the Thakur of Isarda, whose wife was related to his Jadaun Maharani. He died in 1922 and was succeeded by his adopted son, the Maharaja Man Singh.

Honours 
He was honored with GCSI in 1896, GCIE in 1901, and GCVO in 1903 AD. He was given the honorary degree of LLD by the University of Edinburgh in 1908. He also received the Hon rank of Major General in 1911 AD. In 1919, he was honored with GBE. He also received:

Member of the First Class of the Order of the Crown of Prussia: 1910
Donat of the Order of the Hospital of the St. John of Jerusalem: 1912

Salute 
He was entitled to a salute of 21 guns.

References 

Madho
1862 births
1922 deaths
Knights Grand Commander of the Order of the Star of India
Knights Grand Commander of the Order of the Indian Empire
Indian Knights Grand Cross of the Royal Victorian Order
Indian Knights Grand Cross of the Order of the British Empire